Macaria distribuaria, the southern coastal plain angle moth, is a species of geometrid moth in the family Geometridae. It is found in the Caribbean Sea, Central America, and North America.

The MONA or Hodges number for Macaria distribuaria is 6336.

References

Further reading

 

Macariini
Articles created by Qbugbot
Moths described in 1825